Adarnase II, of the Chosroid dynasty, was a presiding prince of Iberia (Kartli, eastern Georgia) from c. 650 to 684/5. He is presumably the Iberian patricius mentioned in the 660s letter of Anastasius Apocrisarius pertaining to the martyrdom of Maximus the Confessor, and the prince Nerses whose revolt against Arabs is reported by the Armenian chronicler Hovannes Draskhanakertsi.

The name Adarnase derives from Middle Persian Ādurnarsēh, with the second component of the word (Nase) being the Georgian attestation of the Middle Persian name Narseh, which ultimately derives from Avestan nairyō.saŋya-. The Middle Persian name Narseh also exists in Georgian as Nerse. The name Ādurnarsēh appears in the Armenian language as Atrnerseh.

Adarnase succeeded his father Stephen II and ruled as a vassal of the Caliphate. In 681/2, however, he joined the Armenian and Albanian princes in a general uprising against the Arab hegemony. He held off the Arab attacks for three years – until the Khazars entered the fight. Adarnase/Nerses was killed, and the Arabs installed Guaram II of the rival Guaramid Dynasty in Iberia.

The exterior stone plaque of the church of the Holy Cross at Mtskheta, Georgia, mentions the principal builders of this church: Stephanos the patricius, Demetrius the hypatos, and Adarnase the hypatos who have traditionally been equated by the Georgian scholars with Stephen I, son of Guaram; Demetre, brother of Stephen I and Adarnase I. However, an opinion expressed by Professor Cyril Toumanoff disagrees with this view by identifying these individuals with Stephen II, Demetre (brother of Stephen I), and Adarnase II, respectively. He had a son, Stephen.

References 

680s deaths
Year of birth unknown
Princes of Iberia
7th-century monarchs in Asia
Patricii
Chosroid dynasty
Monarchs killed in action